Pattaravakkam railway station is one of the railway stations of the Chennai Central–Arakkonam section of the Chennai Suburban Railway Network. Located about 14 km from Chennai Central railway station, the station serves the neighbourhoods of Pattaravakkam and Ambattur Industrial Estate and other smaller suburbs such as Karukku, Kallikuppam, and Menambedu. It has an elevation of 16.01 m above sea level. It is a suburb of Chennai City.

History

The first lines in the station were electrified on 29 November 1979, with the electrification of the Chennai Central–Tiruvallur section. Additional lines at the station were electrified on 2 October 1986, with the electrification of the Villivakkam–Avadi section.

Layout

The station has four tracks, two exclusively for suburban trains. The suburban tracks are served by a side platform and an island platform. The station's entrance and the ticket counter are located on the side platform. The platforms are connected by means of a footbridge for pedestrians.

Facilities

The station is devoid of several basic amenities for several years now. An odd 48 sq ft room is the sole staff building in the station, which houses the only ticket counter of the station. There is no room for the station master or any other security staff in the station.

Traffic

The station handles at least 5,000 to 6,000 commuters a day, which accounts for a financial turnout of  50,000 every day.

Developments
A 1.15 km long, two-laned road overbridge with 21 spans serves the level crossing no. 5 near the station. In 2009, the government sanctioned the  350-million project, which was jointly built by the State Highways and the Southern Railway, but the construction work began in June 2011. It was opened to traffic in June 2014. It connects Aavin Dairy Road in Ambattur with Karukku Main Road.

See also

 Chennai Suburban Railway
 Railway stations in Chennai

References

External links

 Pattaravakkam station at Indiarailinfo.com

Stations of Chennai Suburban Railway
Railway stations in Chennai
Railway stations in Tiruvallur district